Animal rights vary greatly among countries and territories. Such laws range from the legal recognition of non-human animal sentience to the absolute lack of any anti-cruelty laws, with no regard for animal welfare.

As of November 2019, 32 countries have formally recognized non-human animal sentience. These are: Austria, Australia, Belgium, Bulgaria, Chile, Croatia, Cyprus, the Czech Republic, Denmark, Estonia, Finland, France, Germany, Greece, Hungary, Ireland, Italy, Latvia, Lithuania, Luxembourg, Malta, New Zealand, the Netherlands, Poland, Portugal, Romania, Spain, Slovakia, Slovenia, Sweden, Switzerland, and the United Kingdom. It has been proposed that the United Nations (UN) pass the first resolution recognizing animal rights, the Universal Declaration on Animal Welfare, which acknowledges the importance of the sentience of animals and human responsibilities towards them.

The Great Ape Project is currently campaigning to have the United Nations endorse a World Declaration on Great Apes, which would extend to non-human great apes the protection of three basic interests: the right to life, the protection of individual liberty, and the prohibition of torture. Six countries currently ban the use of great apes for scientific research, and Austria is the only country in the world to ban experiments on lesser apes.

In 2009, Bolivia became the first country to banish animal abuse and harm in circuses. The United States of America is the only country in the world that has banned killing horses for consumption, and India is the only country to have banned killing cows for consumption in some of its states.

In 2014, the Jain pilgrimage destination of Palitana City in Indian state of Gujarat became the first city in the world to be legally vegetarian. It has banned buying and selling meat, fish, and eggs, as well as related jobs, such as fishing and animal farming.

Global animal rights maps 

Food production

Clothing and cosmetics

Entertainment

Council of Europe convention maps

Principal laws on animal rights

See also 
 Human rights
 List of animal rights advocates
 List of international animal welfare conventions
 Overview of discretionary invasive procedures on animals

Notes

References 

 
 
Animal rights-related lists
Animal welfare and rights legislation
Animal welfare
Bioethics
Comparisons
Law-related lists
Political movements
Society-related lists